Left for Dead was the final release of ska punk band Shootin' Goon, and was released on vocalist (as of 2002) Matt Redd's own label, Good Clean Fun Records. At the time of release the EP was reviewed by legendary skateboarder Bam Margera for rock magazine Kerrang!, in which he declared, "I thought I was at the fucking circus!", which prompted the band to sell T-shirts with the quote printed on them.

Track listing
 "Every Single Time"
 "Guestlist/Hitlist"
 "Photograph"
 "Wage Slave"
 "MTV"

Line up (at time of recording)
Matt Redd - Vocals
Paul Hewett - Guitar
Jimi Hewett - Bass
Sam Kendall - Drums
Matt Price - Trumpet
Tom Harle - Trombone
Tom Pinder - Trombone (also played trombone for Adequate 7)
Nick Briggs aka The Greek - Saxophone

External links
myspace.com/shootingoon
Moon Ska Europe profile of Shootin' Goon

2003 EPs
Shootin' Goon albums